Hans Schmidt (1 September 1930 – 2 February 2019) was a German musicologist.

Life 
Born in Bonn, Schmidt was professor of musicology at the University of Cologne and a long-standing Beethoven researcher like his father Joseph Schmidt-Görg, who directed the Bonn Beethoven House from 1945 to 1972. Schmidt received his doctorate in 1954 at the Rheinische Friedrich-Wilhelms-Universität Bonn for his thesis Untersuchungen zu den Tractus des zweiten Tones aus dem Codex St. Gallen 359.

Schmidt died in Bad Neuenahr at the age of 88.

Publications about Ludwig van Beethoven

Texts 
 Ludwig van Beethoven, Beethoven-Archiv, Bonn 1970 (with Joseph Schmidt-Görg)
 Die Beethovenhandschriften des Beethovenhauses in Bonn, Beethoven-Archiv, Bonn 1971 
 Das Beethoven-Haus in Bonn, Gesellschaft für Buchdruckerei, Neuss 1977
 Musik-Institut Koblenz – Dokumentation, Koblenz 1983

Articles 

Ludwig van Beethoven, G. Henle Verlag.
 Piano sonatas, vol. I, Wissenschaftliche Gesamtausgabe, Abteilung VII, vol. 2, Munich 1971
 Klaviersonaten, vol. II, Wissenschaftliche Gesamtausgabe, Abteilung VII, vol. 3, Munich 1971
 Werke für Klavier zu vier Händen, Wissenschaftliche Gesamtausgabe, Abteilung VII, vol. 1, Munich 1966
 Große Fuge für Klavier zu vier Händen op. 134, Munich 1966

Books 
 Die gegenwärtige Quellenlage zu Beethovens Choral Fantasy, in Colloquium amicorum, Joseph Schmidt-Görg for the 70th birthday, Bonn 1967
 Das Bonner Beethoven-Archiv, in Bonner Universitätsblätter, Bonn 1968
 Verzeichnis der Skizzen Beethovens, in Beethoven-Jahrbuch VI, Bonn 1969
 Ein Beethoven-Autograph? Über drei Streicherstimmen zu Beethovens Chorfantasie op. 80, die vermutlich nicht von Beethoven geschrieben worden sind, in Die Musikforschung 22, 1969
 Ludwig van Beethoven und seine Beziehungen zu Ehrenbreitstein, in Beethovens Beziehungen zu Koblenz und Ehrenbreitstein, Koblenz 1970
 Beethoven 1970 – Über die Grundlagen des heutigen Beethovenbildes, Typoskript, Bonn 1970
 Zur Errichtung einer Beethoven-Gedenkstätte in Ehrenbreitstein, on the occasion of Beethoven's 200th birthday, in the Bonner Universitätsblätter, Bonn 1970
 Ein wiederaufgefundenes Fidelio-Libretto, in Bericht über den Internationalen Musikwissenschaftlichen Kongress Bonn 1970, Bärenreiter-Verlag, Kassel 1971
 Die Beethovenhandschriften des Beethovenhauses in Bonn, in Beethoven-Jahrbuch VII, Bonn 1971
 Der freie Künstler Ludwig van Beethoven, in Die Welt der Symphony, aus Anlaß des 75jährigen Bestehens der Deutsche Grammophon Gesellschaft, Hamburg/Braunschweig 1972
 Die Grundlagen des heutigen Beethovenbildes, in the Österreichische Musikzeitschrift 28, 1973
 Zur Ausstellung der Sammlung Wegeler in Koblenz – 2. Juni 1973, in the Mitteilungen der Arbeitsgemeinschaft für rheinische Musikgeschichte, 1973
 Aus der Werkstatt eines Handschriftenfälschers – ein Liebesbrief Beethovens, in the Österreichische Musikzeitschrift 29, 1974
 Addenda und Corrigenda zum Katalog Die Beethovenhandschriften des Beethovenhauses in Bonn, in the Beethoven-Jahrbuch 8, Bonn 1975
 Beethovens Klaviersonaten E-Dur op. 109 und As-Dur op. 110, in the Textbeilage zu einer Schallplatte von Maurizio Pollini, Deutsche Grammophon, Hamburg 1975
 Klaviervariationen, in "Text supplement to a record" by Rudolf Buchbinder, Teldec, Hamburg 1976
 Das Bonner Beethoven-Archiv – zum fünfzigjährigen Bestehen, in Beethoven-Jahrbuch 9, 1977 
 Ludwig van Beethoven – eine Dokumentation in Bildern und Manuskripten, in Beihefte der Beethoven-Edition der Deutschen Grammophon-Gesellschaft, Polydor, Hamburg 1977
 Beethoven und die deutsche Sprache, in the Österreichische Musikzeitschrift 32, 1977 
 Beethoven und das Rheinland, in the Bonner Geschichtsblätter 30, 1978
 Edition und Aufführungspraxis am Beispiel von Beethovens  Waldsteinsonate, in Beethoven-Kolloquium 1977; Dokumentation und Aufführungspraxis, Bärenreiter-Verlag, Kassel 1978 
 Neue Hypothesen um Beethovens "unsterbliche Geliebte" , in the Österreichische Musikzeitschrift 35, 1980 (with Rudolf Klein) 
 Beethovens Klaviervariationen, in Textbeilage zu einer Schallplatte von Rudolf Buchbinder, Warner Music Group 1988
 Beethovens besondere Art, Briefe zu schreiben, in Florilegium musicologicum – Hellmut Federhofer for the 65th birthday, Schneider, Tutzing 1988
 "Wir haben in unseren Finales gern rauschendere Passagen..." – Beethoven in seinen Klavierkonzerten, in Beiträge zur Geschichte des Konzerts – Festschrift Siegfried Kross for the 60th birthday, Schröder, Bonn 1990
 Ludwig van Beethoven in seinen Briefen an Eleonore von Breuning und Franz Gerhard Wegeler, in CD-Box, Music von Ludwig van Beethoven. Letter texts read by Will Quadflieg. Overall concept in texts, pictures and music inserts by Schmidt, Polymedia / Deutsche Grammophon, Hamburg 1994
 Fidelio – Variationen einer Oper, in Beiheft zu CD-Box Complete Beethoven edition, Deutsche Grammophon, Hamburg 1997
 Fidelio - Problemwerk oder Schlüsselwerk Beethovens?, in Festschrift Christoph-Hellmut Mahling for the 65th birthday, Schneider, Tutzing 1997 
 Zum Italienischen bei Ludwig van Beethoven – über den Gebrauch der italienischen Sprache in Beethovens Kompositionen und Briefen, beeinflusst durch Mozart's italienische Kompositionen, Salieris Unterricht und die Begegnung mit Rossini, in Aspetti musicali – Musikhistorische Dimensionen Italiens 1600 bis 2000, Festschrift for Dietrich Kämper for the 65th birthday, Verlag Dohr, Cologne 2001
 Systemik bei Beethoven. in Perspektiven und Methoden einer Systemischen Musikwissenschaft, Bericht über das Kolloquium im Musikwissenschaftlichen Institut der University of Cologne 1998, Peter Lang, Frankfurt  2003

Festschrift for his 65th birthday 
 Kirchenmusik in Geschichte und Gegenwart, Festschrift Hans Schmidt zum 65. Geburtstag, edited by Heribert Klein and Klaus Wolfgang Niemöller, Verlag Dohr, Cologne 1998

References

External links 
 

20th-century German musicologists
Beethoven scholars
Academic staff of the University of Cologne
1930 births
2019 deaths
Writers from Bonn